Yellville–Summit School District is an accredited school district located in Yellville, Arkansas, United States. Yellville–Summit School District provides early childhood, elementary secondary education to students in Yellville, Summit and surrounding unincorporated communities of rural Marion County, Arkansas. It was created when the former Yellville and Summit school districts consolidated to form the Yellville–Summit School District.

Schools 
The school district, high school and elementary school are accredited by the Arkansas Department of Education (ADE) and has been accredited by AdvancED since 1997. In 2012, the high school was nationally recognized as a Bronze Medalist in the Best High Schools report by U.S. News & World Report. The Yellville–Summit School District mascot and athletic emblem is the panther with green and white serving as the school colors.

 Yellville–Summit High School – provides secondary education in grades 7 through 12.
 Yellville–Summit Elementary School – provides early childhood and elementary education in prekindergarten through grades 6.

References

External links 
 

School districts in Arkansas
Education in Marion County, Arkansas